Pirangoclytus is a genus of beetles in the family Cerambycidae, containing the following species:

 Pirangoclytus amaryllis (Chevrolat, 1862)
 Pirangoclytus chaparensis Martins & Galileo, 2011
 Pirangoclytus flavius (Bates, 1870)
 Pirangoclytus fraternus Martins & Galileo, 2011
 Pirangoclytus granulipennis (Zajciw, 1963)
 Pirangoclytus insignis (Chevrolat, 1862)
 Pirangoclytus jauffreti Martins & Galileo, 2011
 Pirangoclytus laetus (Fabricius, 1801)
 Pirangoclytus latecinctus (Bates, 1870)
 Pirangoclytus mendosus (Galileo & Martins, 1996)
 Pirangoclytus mniszechii (Chevrolat, 1862)
 Pirangoclytus nubicollis (Zajciw, 1964)
 Pirangoclytus placens (Chevrolat, 1862)
 Pirangoclytus purus (Bates, 1870)
 Pirangoclytus rhinotragoides (Thomson, 1860)
 Pirangoclytus rubefactus (Bates, 1870)
 Pirangoclytus sulphurosus (Di Iorio, 2006)
 Pirangoclytus ycoca (Galileo & Martins, 2007)

References

Clytini